Majid Fakhry (1923 – March 4, 2021) was a prominent Lebanese scholar of Islamic philosophy and Professor Emeritus of philosophy at the American University of Beirut.

Biography
Majid Fakhry was born in 1923 in Lebanon. After earning his bachelor's and master's degrees from the American University of Beirut, Fakhry received his Ph.D. in philosophy from University of Edinburgh in 1949. He taught at the London School of Oriental Studies, UCLA, Princeton University, and Georgetown University, where he spent his final years as professor emeritus, in addition to teaching and leading the Philosophy Department at the American University of Beirut. Fakhry's courses at AUB provided many students with their first introduction to the history of philosophy between the 1950s and the 1980s. Fakhry died in Virginia, United States on March 4, 2021.

Fakhry published A History of Islamic Philosophy in 1970, it is considered the first historical overview on Islamic thought and was well received. Columbia University Press published a revised 3rd edition of Fakhry's A History of Islamic Philosophy in 2004.

Works
 A History of Islamic Philosophy (1970)
 Ethical Theories in Islam (1991)
 Philosophy, Dogma, and the Impact of Greek Thought in Islam (1994)
 An Interpretation of the Qur'an: English Translation of the Meanings (2015) Al-Farabi Founder of Islamic Neoplatonism : His Life, Works and Influence (2002) Islamic Philosophy : A Beginner's Guide Averroes: His Life, Work and Influence''

References

1923 births
2021 deaths
Lebanese scholars
Historians of Islam
Historians of philosophy
Alumni of the University of Edinburgh
American University of Beirut alumni
Academic staff of the American University of Beirut
Georgetown University faculty
Muslim scholars of Islamic studies